Typhonium alismifolium is a species of plant in the arum family that is endemic to Australia.

Description
The species is a deciduous, geophytic, perennial herb, which resprouts annually from a corm about 5 cm in diameter. The oval to trilobed leaves are borne on 10–70 cm long stalks. The flower is enclosed in a 25 cm long spathe, green on the outside, deep brownish-purple on the inside.

Distribution and habitat
The species is known from the Northern Territory as well as north-eastern Queensland, where it grows in dry rainforest and deciduous vine forest.

References

 
alismifolium
Monocots of Australia
Flora of the Northern Territory
Flora of Queensland
Taxa named by Ferdinand von Mueller
Plants described in 1873